Man on the Prowl is a 1957 American film noir crime film directed by Art Napoleon and written by Art Napoleon and Jo Napoleon. The film stars Mala Powers, James Best, Ted de Corsia, Jerry Paris and Vivi Janiss. The film was released on December 1, 1957, by United Artists.

Plot
Under psychiatric care for several years, unknown to his employers, Doug Gerhardt has a job with a car dealership. He borrows a luxury convertible without permission to impress a date, but when she resists his advances at a motel, Doug kills her.

On the way home, Doug nearly runs over Marian Wood and her son. Still obsessed with women, Doug steals a toy belonging to the boy as an excuse for looking up Marian later. He ingratiates himself with Marian at home by repairing her washing machine, then preys on her frustration with husband Woody's frequent absence.

Doug's mother comes to see Marian, warning her about Doug's mental state and mistakenly believing Marian is romantically involved with him. Marian threatens to notify the police, after which Doug murders his mother, assaults Woody and takes their son captive. About to sexually assault Marian, he is killed when she stabs him with a nail file.

Cast 
Mala Powers as Marian Wood
James Best as Doug Gerhardt
Ted de Corsia as Detective
Jerry Paris as Woody
Vivi Janiss as Mrs. Gerhardt
Josh Freeman as Josh Wood
Jeff Freeman as Jeff Wood
Peggy Maley as Alma Doran
Eugenia Paul as Dorothy Pierce
Bob Yeakel as himself

DVD release 
On August 12, 2015, Alpha Video announced that they had located the only surviving print of Man on the Prowl, and that it'd be released on DVD in the near future.

References

External links 
 

1957 films
Film noir
1957 crime films
American crime films
Films scored by Ernest Gold
United Artists films
1957 directorial debut films
1950s English-language films
Films directed by Art Napoleon
1950s American films